The giant penguin is a creature allegedly seen in Florida during the 1940s, and is at least partly documented to have been a hoax. This legend has no scientific merit, despite there having been giant penguins which became extinct millions of years ago.

History 

In 1948, several people reported finding large, three-toed animal tracks at Clearwater Beach in Florida. Later, more tracks were found along the shore of Suwannee River,  from the ocean.

Later that year a giant penguin was allegedly sighted at distance. During this same period, people in a boat off the Florida gulf coast reported seeing an extremely large penguin-like bird floating on the water. These incidents were reported in several newspapers. Later that year, another huge, penguin-like bird was allegedly seen from an airplane on the banks of the Suwannee River in northern Florida. Cryptozoologist Ivan T. Sanderson declared that the creature was a giant penguin that had somehow been driven away from its natural habitat.

On April 11, 1988, St. Petersburg Times reporter Jan Kirby revealed that the penguin hoax had been perpetrated by Tony Signorini and Al Williams, a locally known prankster who died in 1969. Signorini stated they had been inspired by a photograph of fossilized dinosaur tracks, and showed the reporter the huge penguin feet made of iron used in creating the tracks.

Extinct giant penguins 

There were numerous prehistoric species of gigantic penguins (such as Pachydyptes ponderosus and Anthropornis nordenskjoeldi; see also Palaeeudyptinae). However, actual prehistoric megafaunal birds only occurred in South Pacific and Cape Horn ocean waters. This is known from fossil remains. All such lineages certainly became extinct some 37 to 60 million years ago at latest: so they were never encountered alive by humans and were barely contemporaries of the earliest hominids.

In literature 

Giant penguins based on the fossil finds also appear in Jules Verne's novel Journey to the Center of the Earth, and in At the Mountains of Madness by H. P. Lovecraft. In the latter case, they are found in a fictitious Antarctic underground setting and their presence is given a comparatively plausible evolutionary explanation.

References 

Legendary birds
Hoaxes in the United States
1940s hoaxes
1940s in Florida